Portrait of Elisabeth Bas is a portrait by Ferdinand Bol of the Dutch businesswoman Elisabeth Bas, commissioned by her grand-daughter Maria Rey. It is in the collection of the Rijksmuseum Amsterdam, where it is known as Elisabeth Bas and attributed to Ferdinand Bol (1616 - 1680), though the identity of the sitter is held in doubt by the Rijksmuseum.

History and attribution
Until 1911 it was thought to be by Rembrandt, but that year the Rembrandt expert Abraham Bredius re-attributed it to Bol. Such a re-attribution was hotly contested by the collector and art historian Cornelis Hofstede de Groot (1836-1930), but is now accepted. A brand of cigars was named after this painting in the 20th century, produced at a factory at Boxtel and using the painting as a logo, and their bands and the boxes for cigars of this brand are still collectors' items.

References

Paintings in the collection of the Rijksmuseum
Bas
Bas, Elisabeth